This is a list of countries by ecological footprint. The table is based on data spanning from 1961 to 2013 from the
Global Footprint Network's National Footprint Accounts published in 2016. Numbers are given in global hectares per capita. The
world-average ecological footprint in 2016 was 2.75 global hectares per person (22.6 billion in total). With a world-average biocapacity of 1.63 global hectares (gha) per person (12.2 billion in total), this leads to a global ecological deficit of 1.1 global hectares per person (10.4 billion in total).

For humanity, having a footprint smaller than the planet's biocapacity is a necessary condition for sustainability. After all, ecological overuse is only possible temporarily. A country that consumes more than 1.73 gha per person has a resource demand that is not sustainable world-wide if every country were to exceed that consumption level simultaneously. Countries with a footprint below 1.73 gha per person might not be sustainable: the quality of the footprint may still lead to net long-term ecological destruction. If a country does not have enough ecological resources within its own territory to cover its population's footprint, then it runs an ecological deficit and the country is termed an ecological debtor. Otherwise, it has an ecological reserve and it is called a creditor. To a significant degree, biocapacity correlates with access to water resources.

Countries and regions 

 This table below is based on 2012 results (National Footprint Accounts edition 2016). The latest edition (2021), produced by York University, Footprint Data Foundation, and Global Footprint Network, is available on Global Footprint Network's website at http://data.footprintnetwork.org. Note that this list contains only 188 countries, covering most of the countries with more than one million inhabitants.

*Assumes that biocapacity and ecological footprint per person will not change when population changes.

See also

 List of countries by carbon dioxide emissions per capita
 Sustainable development
 List of countries by inequality-adjusted Human Development Index
 Peak water, water resources and water withdrawal

References

Ecological footprint
Ecological footprint
Quality of life
Ecological footprint